João Taveira (born 22 December 1984) is a Portuguese judoka.

Achievements

See also
European Judo Championships
History of martial arts
List of judo techniques
List of judoka
Martial arts timeline

References

External links

Portuguese male judoka
1984 births
Place of birth missing (living people)
Living people